JJ Scheepers is a South African rugby union player for the  in the Currie Cup. His regular position is lock.

Scheepers was named in the  squad for the 2021 Currie Cup Premier Division.

References

South African rugby union players
Living people
Rugby union locks
Blue Bulls players
Year of birth missing (living people)
Falcons (rugby union) players